The FPAI Indian Player of the Year is an annual award given to an Indian player who is adjudged to have been the best of the season in Indian football. The award has been presented since the 2009–10 season and the winner is chosen by a vote amongst the members of the Football Players' Association of India. The first awardee was Sunil Chhetri. Since 2022, the woman counterpart of the awarded is also presented with Anju Tamang being the first awardee of it.

Winners

See also 
 AIFF Player of the Year Awards
 Football Players' Association of India
 Football in India

References

Annual events in India
Indian sports trophies and awards